Tin (50Sn) is the element with the greatest number of stable isotopes (ten; three of them are potentially radioactive but have not been observed to decay), which is probably related to the fact that 50 is a "magic number" of protons. Twenty-nine additional unstable isotopes are known, including the "doubly magic" tin-100 (100Sn) (discovered in 1994) and tin-132 (132Sn). The longest-lived radioisotope is 126Sn, with a half-life of 230,000 years. The other 28 radioisotopes have half-lives less than a year.

List of isotopes 

|-
| 99Sn
| style="text-align:right" | 50
| style="text-align:right" | 49
| 98.94933(64)#
| 5# ms
|
|
| 9/2+#
|
|
|-
| rowspan=2|100Sn
| rowspan=2 style="text-align:right" | 50
| rowspan=2 style="text-align:right" | 50
| rowspan=2|99.93904(76)
| rowspan=2|1.1(4) s[0.94(+54−27) s]
| β+ (83%)
| 100In
| rowspan=2|0+
| rowspan=2|
| rowspan=2|
|-
| β+, p (17%)
| 99Cd
|-
| rowspan=2|101Sn
| rowspan=2 style="text-align:right" | 50
| rowspan=2 style="text-align:right" | 51
| rowspan=2|100.93606(32)#
| rowspan=2|3(1) s
| β+
| 101In
| rowspan=2|5/2+#
| rowspan=2|
| rowspan=2|
|-
| β+, p (rare)
| 100Cd
|-
| rowspan=2|102Sn
| rowspan=2 style="text-align:right" | 50
| rowspan=2 style="text-align:right" | 52
| rowspan=2|101.93030(14)
| rowspan=2|4.5(7) s
| β+
| 102In
| rowspan=2|0+
| rowspan=2|
| rowspan=2|
|-
| β+, p (rare)
| 101Cd
|-
| style="text-indent:1em" | 102mSn
| colspan="3" style="text-indent:2em" | 2017(2) keV
| 720(220) ns
|
|
| (6+)
|
|
|-
| rowspan=2|103Sn
| rowspan=2 style="text-align:right" | 50
| rowspan=2 style="text-align:right" | 53
| rowspan=2|102.92810(32)#
| rowspan=2|7.0(6) s
| β+
| 103In
| rowspan=2|5/2+#
| rowspan=2|
| rowspan=2|
|-
| β+, p (rare)
| 102Cd
|-
| 104Sn
| style="text-align:right" | 50
| style="text-align:right" | 54
| 103.92314(11)
| 20.8(5) s
| β+
| 104In
| 0+
|
|
|-
| rowspan=2|105Sn
| rowspan=2 style="text-align:right" | 50
| rowspan=2 style="text-align:right" | 55
| rowspan=2|104.92135(9)
| rowspan=2|34(1) s
| β+
| 105In
| rowspan=2|(5/2+)
| rowspan=2|
| rowspan=2|
|-
| β+, p (rare)
| 104Cd
|-
| 106Sn
| style="text-align:right" | 50
| style="text-align:right" | 56
| 105.91688(5)
| 115(5) s
| β+
| 106In
| 0+
|
|
|-
| 107Sn
| style="text-align:right" | 50
| style="text-align:right" | 57
| 106.91564(9)
| 2.90(5) min
| β+
| 107In
| (5/2+)
|
|
|-
| 108Sn
| style="text-align:right" | 50
| style="text-align:right" | 58
| 107.911925(21)
| 10.30(8) min
| β+
| 108In
| 0+
|
|
|-
| 109Sn
| style="text-align:right" | 50
| style="text-align:right" | 59
| 108.911283(11)
| 18.0(2) min
| β+
| 109In
| 5/2(+)
|
|
|-
| 110Sn
| style="text-align:right" | 50
| style="text-align:right" | 60
| 109.907843(15)
| 4.11(10) h
| EC
| 110In
| 0+
|
|
|-
| 111Sn
| style="text-align:right" | 50
| style="text-align:right" | 61
| 110.907734(7)
| 35.3(6) min
| β+
| 111In
| 7/2+
|
|
|-
| style="text-indent:1em" | 111mSn
| colspan="3" style="text-indent:2em" | 254.72(8) keV
| 12.5(10) µs
|
|
| 1/2+
|
|
|-
| 112Sn
| style="text-align:right" | 50
| style="text-align:right" | 62
| 111.904818(5)
| colspan=3 align=center|Observationally Stable
| 0+
| 0.0097(1)
|
|-
| 113Sn
| style="text-align:right" | 50
| style="text-align:right" | 63
| 112.905171(4)
| 115.09(3) d
| β+
| 113In
| 1/2+
|
|
|-
| rowspan=2 style="text-indent:1em" | 113mSn
| rowspan=2 colspan="3" style="text-indent:2em" | 77.386(19) keV
| rowspan=2|21.4(4) min
| IT (91.1%)
| 113Sn
| rowspan=2|7/2+
| rowspan=2|
| rowspan=2|
|-
| β+ (8.9%)
| 113In
|-
| 114Sn
| style="text-align:right" | 50
| style="text-align:right" | 64
| 113.902779(3)
| colspan=3 align=center|Stable
| 0+
| 0.0066(1)
|
|-
| style="text-indent:1em" | 114mSn
| colspan="3" style="text-indent:2em" | 3087.37(7) keV
| 733(14) ns
|
|
| 7−
|
|
|-
| 115Sn
| style="text-align:right" | 50
| style="text-align:right" | 65
| 114.903342(3)
| colspan=3 align=center|Stable
| 1/2+
| 0.0034(1)
|
|-
| style="text-indent:1em" | 115m1Sn
| colspan="3" style="text-indent:2em" | 612.81(4) keV
| 3.26(8) µs
|
|
| 7/2+
|
|
|-
| style="text-indent:1em" | 115m2Sn
| colspan="3" style="text-indent:2em" | 713.64(12) keV
| 159(1) µs
|
|
| 11/2−
|
|
|-
| 116Sn
| style="text-align:right" | 50
| style="text-align:right" | 66
| 115.901741(3)
| colspan=3 align=center|Stable
| 0+
| 0.1454(9)
|
|-
| 117Sn
| style="text-align:right" | 50
| style="text-align:right" | 67
| 116.902952(3)
| colspan=3 align=center|Stable
| 1/2+
| 0.0768(7)
|
|-
| style="text-indent:1em" | 117m1Sn
| colspan="3" style="text-indent:2em" | 314.58(4) keV
| 13.76(4) d
| IT
| 117Sn
| 11/2−
|
|
|-
| style="text-indent:1em" | 117m2Sn
| colspan="3" style="text-indent:2em" | 2406.4(4) keV
| 1.75(7) µs
|
|
| (19/2+)
|
|
|-
| 118Sn
| style="text-align:right" | 50
| style="text-align:right" | 68
| 117.901603(3)
| colspan=3 align=center|Stable
| 0+
| 0.2422(9)
|
|-
| 119Sn
| style="text-align:right" | 50
| style="text-align:right" | 69
| 118.903308(3)
| colspan=3 align=center|Stable
| 1/2+
| 0.0859(4)
|
|-
| style="text-indent:1em" | 119m1Sn
| colspan="3" style="text-indent:2em" | 89.531(13) keV
| 293.1(7) d
| IT
| 119Sn
| 11/2−
|
|
|-
| style="text-indent:1em" | 119m2Sn
| colspan="3" style="text-indent:2em" | 2127.0(10) keV
| 9.6(12) µs
|
|
| (19/2+)
|
|
|-
| 120Sn
| style="text-align:right" | 50
| style="text-align:right" | 70
| 119.9021947(27)
| colspan=3 align=center|Stable
| 0+
| 0.3258(9)
|
|-
| style="text-indent:1em" | 120m1Sn
| colspan="3" style="text-indent:2em" | 2481.63(6) keV
| 11.8(5) µs
|
|
| (7−)
|
|
|-
| style="text-indent:1em" | 120m2Sn
| colspan="3" style="text-indent:2em" | 2902.22(22) keV
| 6.26(11) µs
|
|
| (10+)#
|
|
|-
| 121Sn
| style="text-align:right" | 50
| style="text-align:right" | 71
| 120.9042355(27)
| 27.03(4) h
| β−
| 121Sb
| 3/2+
|
|
|-
| rowspan=2 style="text-indent:1em" | 121m1Sn
| rowspan=2 colspan="3" style="text-indent:2em" | 6.30(6) keV
| rowspan=2|43.9(5) y
| IT (77.6%)
| 121Sn
| rowspan=2| 11/2−
| rowspan=2|
| rowspan=2|
|-
| β− (22.4%)
| 121Sb
|-
| style="text-indent:1em" | 121m2Sn
| colspan="3" style="text-indent:2em" | 1998.8(9) keV
| 5.3(5) µs
|
|
| (19/2+)#
|
|
|-
| style="text-indent:1em" | 121m3Sn
| colspan="3" style="text-indent:2em" | 2834.6(18) keV
| 0.167(25) µs
|
|
| (27/2−)
|
|
|-
| 122Sn
| style="text-align:right" | 50
| style="text-align:right" | 72
| 121.9034390(29)
| colspan=3 align=center|Observationally Stable
| 0+
| 0.0463(3)
|
|-
| 123Sn
| style="text-align:right" | 50
| style="text-align:right" | 73
| 122.9057208(29)
| 129.2(4) d
| β−
| 123Sb
| 11/2−
|
|
|-
| style="text-indent:1em" | 123m1Sn
| colspan="3" style="text-indent:2em" | 24.6(4) keV
| 40.06(1) min
| β−
| 123Sb
| 3/2+
|
|
|-
| style="text-indent:1em" | 123m2Sn
| colspan="3" style="text-indent:2em" | 1945.0(10) keV
| 7.4(26) µs
|
|
| (19/2+)
|
|
|-
| style="text-indent:1em" | 123m3Sn
| colspan="3" style="text-indent:2em" | 2153.0(12) keV
| 6 µs
|
|
| (23/2+)
|
|
|-
| style="text-indent:1em" | 123m4Sn
| colspan="3" style="text-indent:2em" | 2713.0(14) keV
| 34 µs
|
|
| (27/2−)
|
|
|-
| 124Sn
| style="text-align:right" | 50
| style="text-align:right" | 74
| 123.9052739(15)
| colspan=3 align=center|Observationally Stable
| 0+
| 0.0579(5)
|
|-
| style="text-indent:1em" | 124m1Sn
| colspan="3" style="text-indent:2em" | 2204.622(23) keV
| 0.27(6) µs
|
|
| 5-
|
|
|-
| style="text-indent:1em" | 124m2Sn
| colspan="3" style="text-indent:2em" | 2325.01(4) keV
| 3.1(5) µs
|
|
| 7−
|
|
|-
| style="text-indent:1em" | 124m3Sn
| colspan="3" style="text-indent:2em" | 2656.6(5) keV
| 45(5) µs
|
|
| (10+)#
|
|
|-
| 125Sn
| style="text-align:right" | 50
| style="text-align:right" | 75
| 124.9077841(16)
| 9.64(3) d
| β−
| 125Sb
| 11/2−
|
|
|-
| style="text-indent:1em" | 125mSn
| colspan="3" style="text-indent:2em" | 27.50(14) keV
| 9.52(5) min
| β−
| 125Sb
| 3/2+
|
|
|-
| rowspan=2|126Sn
| rowspan=2 style="text-align:right" | 50
| rowspan=2 style="text-align:right" | 76
| rowspan=2|125.907653(11)
| rowspan=2|2.30(14)×105 y
| β− (66.5%)
| 126m2Sb
| rowspan=2|0+
| rowspan=2|
| rowspan=2|
|-
| β− (33.5%)
| 126m1Sb
|-
| style="text-indent:1em" | 126m1Sn
| colspan="3" style="text-indent:2em" | 2218.99(8) keV
| 6.6(14) µs
|
|
| 7−
|
|
|-
| style="text-indent:1em" | 126m2Sn
| colspan="3" style="text-indent:2em" | 2564.5(5) keV
| 7.7(5) µs
|
|
| (10+)#
|
|
|-
| 127Sn
| style="text-align:right" | 50
| style="text-align:right" | 77
| 126.910360(26)
| 2.10(4) h
| β−
| 127Sb
| (11/2−)
|
|
|-
| style="text-indent:1em" | 127mSn
| colspan="3" style="text-indent:2em" | 4.7(3) keV
| 4.13(3) min
| β−
| 127Sb
| (3/2+)
|
|
|-
| 128Sn
| style="text-align:right" | 50
| style="text-align:right" | 78
| 127.910537(29)
| 59.07(14) min
| β−
| 128Sb
| 0+
|
|
|-
| style="text-indent:1em" | 128mSn
| colspan="3" style="text-indent:2em" | 2091.50(11) keV
| 6.5(5) s
| IT
| 128Sn
| (7−)
|
|
|-
| 129Sn
| style="text-align:right" | 50
| style="text-align:right" | 79
| 128.91348(3)
| 2.23(4) min
| β−
| 129Sb
| (3/2+)#
|
|
|-
| rowspan=2 style="text-indent:1em" | 129mSn
| rowspan=2 colspan="3" style="text-indent:2em" | 35.2(3) keV
| rowspan=2|6.9(1) min
| β− (99.99%)
| 129Sb
| rowspan=2|(11/2−)#
| rowspan=2|
| rowspan=2|
|-
| IT (.002%)
| 129Sn
|-
| 130Sn
| style="text-align:right" | 50
| style="text-align:right" | 80
| 129.913967(11)
| 3.72(7) min
| β−
| 130Sb
| 0+
|
|
|-
| style="text-indent:1em" | 130m1Sn
| colspan="3" style="text-indent:2em" | 1946.88(10) keV
| 1.7(1) min
| β−
| 130Sb
| (7−)#
|
|
|-
| style="text-indent:1em" | 130m2Sn
| colspan="3" style="text-indent:2em" | 2434.79(12) keV
| 1.61(15) µs
|
|
| (10+)
|
|
|-
| 131Sn
| style="text-align:right" | 50
| style="text-align:right" | 81
| 130.917000(23)
| 56.0(5) s
| β−
| 131Sb
| (3/2+)
|
|
|-
| rowspan=2 style="text-indent:1em" | 131m1Sn
| rowspan=2 colspan="3" style="text-indent:2em" | 80(30)# keV
| rowspan=2|58.4(5) s
| β− (99.99%)
| 131Sb
| rowspan=2|(11/2−)
| rowspan=2|
| rowspan=2|
|-
| IT (.0004%)
| 131Sn
|-
| style="text-indent:1em" | 131m2Sn
| colspan="3" style="text-indent:2em" | 4846.7(9) keV
| 300(20) ns
|
|
| (19/2− to 23/2−)
|
|
|-
| 132Sn
| style="text-align:right" | 50
| style="text-align:right" | 82
| 131.917816(15)
| 39.7(8) s
| β−
| 132Sb
| 0+
|
|
|-
| rowspan=2|133Sn
| rowspan=2 style="text-align:right" | 50
| rowspan=2 style="text-align:right" | 83
| rowspan=2|132.92383(4)
| rowspan=2|1.45(3) s
| β− (99.97%)
| 133Sb
| rowspan=2|(7/2−)#
| rowspan=2|
| rowspan=2|
|-
| β−, n (.0294%)
| 132Sb
|-
| rowspan=2|134Sn
| rowspan=2 style="text-align:right" | 50
| rowspan=2 style="text-align:right" | 84
| rowspan=2|133.92829(11)
| rowspan=2|1.050(11) s
| β− (83%)
| 134Sb
| rowspan=2|0+
| rowspan=2|
| rowspan=2|
|-
| β−, n (17%)
| 133Sb
|-
| rowspan=2|135Sn
| rowspan=2 style="text-align:right" | 50
| rowspan=2 style="text-align:right" | 85
| rowspan=2|134.93473(43)#
| rowspan=2|530(20) ms
| β−
| 135Sb
| rowspan=2|(7/2−)
| rowspan=2|
| rowspan=2|
|-
| β−, n
| 134Sb
|-
| rowspan=2|136Sn
| rowspan=2 style="text-align:right" | 50
| rowspan=2 style="text-align:right" | 86
| rowspan=2|135.93934(54)#
| rowspan=2|0.25(3) s
| β−
| 136Sb
| rowspan=2|0+
| rowspan=2|
| rowspan=2|
|-
| β−, n
| 135Sb
|-
| 137Sn
| style="text-align:right" | 50
| style="text-align:right" | 87
| 136.94599(64)#
| 190(60) ms
| β−
| 137Sb
| 5/2−#
|
|
|-
| 138Sn
| style="text-align:right" | 50
| style="text-align:right" | 88
| 137.951840(540)#
| 140 ms +30-20
| β−
| 138Sb
|
|
|
|-
| style="text-indent:1em" | 138mSn
| colspan="3" style="text-indent:2em" | 1344(2) keV
| 210(45) ns
|
|
|
|
|
|-
| 139Sn
| style="text-align:right" | 50
| style="text-align:right" | 89
| 137.951840(540)#
| 130 ms
| β−
| 139Sb
|
|
|

Tin-121m
Tin-121m is a radioisotope and nuclear isomer of tin with a half-life of 43.9 years.

In a normal thermal reactor, it has a very low fission product yield; thus, this isotope is not a significant contributor to nuclear waste. Fast fission or fission of some heavier actinides will produce 121mSn at higher yields. For example, its yield from U-235 is 0.0007% per thermal fission and 0.002% per fast fission.

Tin-126

Tin-126 is a radioisotope of tin and one of only seven long-lived fission products. While tin-126's half-life of 230,000 years translates to a low specific activity of gamma radiation, its short-lived decay products, two isomers of antimony-126, emit 17 and 40 keV gamma radiation and a 3.67 MeV beta particle on their way to stable tellurium-126, making external exposure to tin-126 a potential concern.

126Sn is in the middle of the mass range for fission products. Thermal reactors, which make up almost all current nuclear power plants, produce it at a very low yield (0.056% for 235U), since slow neutrons almost always fission 235U or 239Pu into unequal halves. Fast fission in a fast reactor or nuclear weapon, or fission of some heavy minor actinides such as californium, will produce it at higher yields.
ANL factsheet

References

 Isotope masses from:

 Isotopic compositions and standard atomic masses from:

 Half-life, spin, and isomer data selected from:

 
Tin
Tin